The history of the National Basketball Association's Charlotte Hornets dates to 1985 when founder George Shinn first thought of bringing professional basketball to Charlotte, North Carolina. The Hornets commenced play as an expansion team in 1988. After fourteen seasons under its original ownership, the franchise suspended operations in 2002 when Shinn transferred the basketball organization under his control to a new franchise in New Orleans. The Charlotte franchise was subsequently acquired, reactivated and renamed the Bobcats by Robert L. Johnson. After restocking its roster through their second expansion draft, the team resumed play in 2004. Johnson sold controlling interest to the club's current owner, Hall of Fame legend and North Carolinian native Michael Jordan, in 2010. The franchise, which reverted to its original name in 2014, has reached the postseason twelve times and made ten playoff appearances, but as of  they are the oldest team in all of North American major professional sports to have never won a division championship.

1988–2002: The Original Charlotte Hornets

1985–1988: The NBA comes to Charlotte
In 1985, the NBA, with 23 teams, was planning to expand by four teams by the 1988–89 season. George Shinn, an entrepreneur from Kannapolis, North Carolina, wanted to bring an NBA team to the Charlotte area, and he assembled a group of prominent local businessmen to head the prospective franchise. The Charlotte area had long been a hotbed for college basketball. The Atlantic Coast Conference's four North Carolina teams had very large and very loyal fan bases in the region, as did local teams UNC Charlotte, Davidson, and Johnson C. Smith. Charlotte was also one of the fastest-growing cities in the United States, and was previously one of the three in-state regional homes to the American Basketball Association's Carolina Cougars.

Some critics doubted that Charlotte, then mostly known for banking, could support an NBA team; one Sacramento Bee columnist joked, "The only franchise Charlotte is going to get is one with Golden Arches."  However, Shinn's ace in the hole was the Charlotte Coliseum, a state-of-the-art arena under construction that would seat almost 24,000 spectators – the largest basketball-specific arena to serve as a full-time home for an NBA team. On April 5, 1987, NBA Commissioner David Stern called Shinn to award the NBA's 24th franchise, to begin play in 1988. Franchises were also granted to Miami, Minneapolis-Saint Paul, and Orlando. Playing heavily on the area's support of college basketball, the new team ran billboards in the area saying, "Bringing the NBA to Basketball Country!"

Originally, the team was intended to be named the Charlotte Spirit, but a name-the-team contest yielded "Hornets" as the winning choice. That name was derived from the city's fierce resistance to British occupation during the Revolutionary War, which prompted the British commander, Lord Cornwallis, to refer to it as "a veritable hornet's nest of rebellion". The name had been used for previous Charlotte sports teams, including a minor league baseball team from 1901 to 1972, and  a World Football League team that played there from 1974 to 1975. In addition the Charlotte 49ers and Davidson Wildcats of the NCAA play annually for the Hornets' Nest Trophy.

The team received attention when it chose teal as its primary color, setting off a sports fashion craze in the late 1980s and early 1990s, with many pro and amateur clubs soon following with teal in their color schemes. The team's uniforms were designed by international designer and North Carolina native Alexander Julian, and featured a first for NBA uniforms—pinstripes. Similar designs by the Orlando Magic, Toronto Raptors, Houston Rockets, Chicago Bulls, and Indiana Pacers followed soon after.

Shinn hired Carl Scheer, a longtime NBA executive, as the team's first general manager. Scheer sought a roster of veteran players, hoping to put together a competitive team as soon as possible, with a goal of making the playoffs in five years. Former college coach and veteran NBA assistant Dick Harter was hired as the team's first head coach.

In 1988, the Hornets and the Miami Heat were part of the 1988 NBA Expansion Draft. Unlike many expansion franchises that invest in the future with a team composed entirely of young players, Charlotte stocked its inaugural roster with several veterans in hopes of putting a competitive lineup on the court right away. The team also had three draft picks at the 1988 NBA draft.

1988–1992: Early seasons
In their inaugural season the Hornets were led by ex-Pistons guard Kelly Tripucka, who provided instant offense and was Charlotte's top scorer for the franchise's first two seasons. Other notable players included sharpshooting rookie (and first draft selection) Rex Chapman, a long-distance scoring threat, and floor general Muggsy Bogues, the shortest player in NBA history at 5'3". The Hornets' first NBA game took place on November 4, 1988, at the Charlotte Coliseum, and was a 133–93 loss to the Cleveland Cavaliers.  The opening night lineup included Tripucka, Kurt Rambis, Dave Hoppen, Robert Reid, and Rickey Green. Four days later, the team notched their first victory over the Los Angeles Clippers, 117–105.  On December 14, in a win over the Indiana Pacers, Tripucka scored 40 points. Tripucka would score 40 points twice more that season. On December 23, 1988, the Hornets really gave their fans something to cheer about, beating Michael Jordan and the Chicago Bulls 103–101 at the buzzer in Jordan's professional debut in North Carolina.  Muggsy Bogues set a club record on April 23, handing out 19 assists in a game against the Boston Celtics. The Hornets finished their inaugural season with a record of 20 wins and 62 losses.

Despite concerns that the Coliseum was too big, the Hornets were a runaway hit in their first season, leading the NBA in attendance, a feat they would achieve seven more times in Charlotte. Eventually, the Hornets would sell out 364 consecutive games—almost nine consecutive seasons.

The Hornets' second season was a struggle from start to finish. The team lost their first five games before defeating the Orlando Magic in the first meeting between the two franchises. Members of the team rebelled against Dick Harter's defense-oriented style, and he was replaced mid-season by assistant Gene Littles following a dismal 8–32 start. Despite the change, the team continued to struggle during the second half, suffering through a 3–31 stretch from January through March. In the end, the team took a step backwards, finishing the season with a disappointing  record – one game worse than their previous season.

In the 1990 NBA draft, the Hornets selected guard Kendall Gill with the 5th overall pick. The team showed improvement during the 1990–91 season. They won eight of their first 15 games, including a 120–105 victory over the Washington Bullets. However, the team went cold, losing their next 11 games and falling to 8–18. The Hornets, who hosted the 1991 NBA All-Star Game, finished their third season with a  record. Despite the team's seven-game improvement over the previous season, Gene Littles was fired and replaced by general manager Allan Bristow.

1992–1995: Larry Johnson and Alonzo Mourning era

1991–92 season: Drafting Larry Johnson
With the first pick in the 1991 NBA draft, the Hornets drafted power forward Larry Johnson from the University of Nevada, Las Vegas. Johnson had an impact season, finishing among the league leaders in points and rebounds, and winning the 1992 NBA Rookie of the Year Award. Additionally, Guard Kendall Gill led the club in scoring, averaging over 20 points per game. Despite continuing to improve, the Hornets failed to qualify for the playoffs for the fourth consecutive season.

1992–1994: Drafting Alonzo Mourning and first playoff appearance
The Hornets were in the lottery again in 1992 and won the second overall pick in the draft, using it to select Georgetown center Alonzo Mourning. The Hornets now had two 20–10 threats in Johnson and Mourning, who with Kendall Gill, formed perhaps the league's top young trio. Finishing fifth in the Eastern Conference, the Hornets upset the Boston Celtics in the first round, with Mourning winning the series with a 20-footer in game four. However, the Hornets lacked the experience and depth to defeat the New York Knicks, falling in five games in the second round.

The Hornets finished the 1993–94 season with a  record, narrowly missing the playoffs. Despite injuries to both Johnson and Mourning, the two led the team in points-per-game. The following season, the Hornets finished the regular season with 50 wins and 32 losses, and returned to the playoffs. Johnson and Mourning again led the team in points-per-game, while also leading the club in rebounding. However, Charlotte was bounced from the playoffs in the first round, falling to the Chicago Bulls in four games.

1995–1998: Glen Rice era
The Johnson–Mourning era came to an end, as the Hornets traded Mourning to the Miami Heat for forward Glen Rice, center Matt Geiger, and guard Khalid Reeves. Glen Rice would make an immediate impact after joining the Hornets, leading the team in scoring and points-per-game during the 1995–96 season. While Rice and Johnson provided high-powered scoring, Geiger tied with Johnson for the team lead in rebounds, and All-Star guard Kenny Anderson ran the point for the injured Muggsy Bogues. The Hornets were competitive, but failed to qualify for the playoffs during the season, again finishing with a  record. Bristow resigned at the end of the season, and was replaced by NBA legend Dave Cowens.

The 1996 off-season was again marked by vast changes: Anderson declined to re-sign, Johnson was shipped to the Knicks for power forward Anthony Mason, and the team made a trade on draft day 1996. They acquired center Vlade Divac from the Los Angeles Lakers for the rights to Kobe Bryant, who the Hornets picked 13th in the draft. The new-look Hornets were successful, with Divac and Geiger providing the center combination, Mason averaging a double-double, Bogues back at the point, and Rice having the finest season of his career. The team achieved the best season in its history at the time, finishing with 54 victories compared to only 28 losses, and making it back to the playoffs. Rice finishing third in the league in scoring, earning all-NBA second team honors, and was also the All-Star Game MVP, setting several scoring records. Despite the success during the regular season, the Hornets went down rather meekly to the Knicks in three straight games.

The 1997–98 season was also successful. Muggsy Bogues was traded two games into the season, and the team picked up point guard David Wesley and shooting guard Bobby Phills. With Wesley, Phills, Rice, Mason, and Divac, the Hornets romped through the regular season, finishing with a 51–31 record; Rice had another good season, as he finished sixth in league scoring and earned all-NBA third team honors. The Hornets made it to back-to-back playoffs for the first time in franchise history, and advanced to the second round, only to again be stopped by the Bulls.

1998–2002: Final years of the original Hornets
The 1998–99 season was turbulent. The season didn't start until February, as the lockout shortened the regular season to only 50 games. Glen Rice was traded to the Lakers for Eddie Jones and Elden Campbell, and Dave Cowens resigned midway through the season, with the highest winning percentage among Hornets head coaches. He was replaced by former Celtics teammate Paul Silas, who became the franchise's fifth head coach. The team finished the season with a  record, but failed to qualify for the playoffs.

The 1999–2000 season saw a return to prominence, with the addition of point guard Baron Davis, the third overall draft pick. The Hornets tore through much of the season, but tragedy struck on January 12, 2000, when fan favorite and top reserve Bobby Phills was killed in an automobile accident. The Hornets retired his No. 13 on February 9, 2000 (The jersey would be re-hang again when the Hornets returned to Charlotte). After finishing with a  record, the team returned to the playoffs, where they lost to the Philadelphia 76ers in the first round. The season, however, was overshadowed by events off the court. The team's popularity had begun to sag due to fan discontent with owner George Shinn's personnel moves; he had reportedly traded Mourning and other stars out of an unwillingness to pay market value. Additionally, Michael Jordan, a North Carolina native, began negotiations to become part-owner, but talks collapsed when Shinn refused to grant Jordan control over basketball operations. Because of this, season attendance dropped to eleventh in the league.

In the 2000–01 season, with the additions of Jamal Mashburn and P.J. Brown, the Hornets managed to return to the playoffs, finishing with a  record. While they upset the third-seeded Heat in the first round and made it to the conference semifinals for the third time in franchise history, they lost to the Milwaukee Bucks in seven games. Despite continuing to play well, their popularity continued to fall, with the team finishing 21st in the league in attendance.

After defeating the Orlando Magic in the first round, they were upended by the New Jersey Nets in five games in the Conference Semifinals. The team finished twenty-ninth (last) in the league in attendance, a stark contrast to their earlier years in Charlotte. Before the Hornets were eliminated from the playoffs, the NBA approved a deal for the team to move to New Orleans following the season.

2002–2003: relocation to New Orleans
Many attributed the Hornets lapse in popularity  during the late 1990s and early 2000s to the team's owner, George Shinn, who was slowly becoming hated by the fans.  In 1997, a Charlotte woman claimed that Shinn had raped her, and the subsequent trial severely tarnished his reputation.  The consensus was that while Charlotte was as basketball-crazy as ever, fans took out their anger at Shinn on the team. Shinn was also discontented with the Charlotte Coliseum, which, although considered state-of-the-art when it opened in 1988, had a limited number of luxury boxes. On March 26, 2001, both the Hornets and the Vancouver Grizzlies applied for relocation to Memphis, Tennessee, which was ultimately won by the Grizzlies. Shinn issued an ultimatum: unless the city built a new arena at no cost to him, the Hornets would leave town. The city initially refused, leading Shinn to consider moving the team to either Norfolk, Louisville, or St. Louis.

Of the cities in the running, only St. Louis had an NBA-ready arena (Savvis Center, now known as the Enterprise Center) already in place and was a larger media market than Charlotte at the time; also, it was the only one of the four to have an previously had hosted an NBA franchise — the St. Louis Hawks (who moved to Atlanta in 1968). However, Savvis Center was eventually ruled out in large part because it already hosted a National Hockey League team whose primary tenants (the St. Louis Blues) were guaranteed priority for scheduling even if an NBA team moved there. Also, at the time St. Louis already had teams in both of the other two "Big Four" major professional sports leagues — the market was smaller than any other at the time with teams in all four except for Denver, which has proven able to support four teams due to its relative isolation from other major sports markets.

Finally, a new arena in Uptown, which would eventually become the Charlotte Bobcats Arena (later to become Time Warner Cable Arena and now known as the Spectrum Center), was included in a non-binding referendum for a larger arts-related package, and Shinn withdrew his application to move the team.  Polls showed the referendum on its way to passage.  However, just days before the referendum, Mayor Pat McCrory vetoed a living wage ordinance. The veto prompted many of the city's black ministers to oppose the referendum. They felt it was immoral for the city to build a new arena when city employees weren't paid enough to make a living. After the referendum failed, city leaders devised a plan to build a new arena that did not require voter support, but made it known that they would not consider building it unless Shinn sold the team. While even the NBA acknowledged that Shinn had alienated fans, league officials felt such a demand would anger other owners as it could set a precedent.  The city council refused to remove the statement, leading the Hornets to request a move to New Orleans – a move which would eventually return pro basketball to the city after the Jazz moved to Salt Lake City in 1979. The NBA approved the move and as part of the deal, as well as to avoid a Browns-like lawsuit, the NBA promised that Charlotte would get a new expansion franchise, although unlike the arrangement agreed to in 1996 by the NFL for Cleveland, the NBA also agreed at the time to allow Shinn to relocate the extant Hornets' franchise and history to New Orleans.

2004–2014: Charlotte Bobcats

2003: Establishing the Bobcats
Shortly after the New Orleans relocation, the NBA became receptive to adding an expansion team in Charlotte for the 2004–05 season, if an arena deal could be reached. Several ownership groups, including one led by former Boston Celtics star Larry Bird, made bids for the franchise. On December 18, 2002, a group led by Black Entertainment Television founder Robert L. Johnson was awarded the franchise, with Johnson becoming the first African American majority owner in major U.S. professional sports.  The rapper Nelly became a minority owner.

In June 2003, the team was named the Bobcats. The Charlotte Regional Sports Commission "Help Name The Team" effort drew over 1,250 suggestions. The three finalists were Bobcats, Dragons, and the eventual winner Flight, referencing North Carolina's "First in Flight" status due to the Wright Flyer as well as the state's military bases. But "Flight" was eventually discarded by Johnson and the team, being considered too abstract and reminiscent of the then-current Iraq War aerial strikes. During the summer of 2003, at a street festival crowd of 7,000 fans, the franchise unveiled "Bobcats" as the team name. The bobcat, according to the North Carolina Wildlife Commission, is an athletic, fierce predator indigenous to the Carolinas. Since Charlotte was already home to the Carolina Panthers of the National Football League, designer Chris Weiller created the team logo to alay confusion or close comparison. There was suspicion that owner Robert "Bob" Johnson chose "Bobcats" as a play on his name.

The Bobcats hired Bernie Bickerstaff as the first head coach and general manager. A new arena to host the Bobcats at uptown Charlotte began construction in July 2003, and the team played its home games at the Coliseum until the new building was ready. After failed attempts at the ballot box to force the team to fully fund the arena, city politicians implemented a hotel and leisure tax in Charlotte to help pay for it.

2004–2008: The beginning of the Bobcats 
The Bobcats held their expansion draft on June 22, 2004, picking up youngsters Gerald Wallace, Primož Brezec, and Jason Kapono. They also drafted talented European players Predrag Drobnjak, Sasha Pavlović, and Zaza Pachulia, however they would be cut before the season opener.  Shortly after, they traded with the Los Angeles Clippers to acquire the second pick in the 2004 NBA draft, which they used to select Emeka Okafor, a center from Connecticut. The Bobcats' first game of the 2004–05 season took place on November 4 at the Charlotte Coliseum, losing 103–96 to the Washington Wizards.  Two days later, they won their first game in franchise history over the Orlando Magic, 111–100.  On December 14, the Bobcats beat the New Orleans Hornets 94–93 in overtime in the Hornets first game in Charlotte after their move to New Orleans. However, the Bobcats mostly struggled during their inaugural season, finishing with a record of 18–64, never winning more than two games in a row.  Emeka Okafor performed well, winning the 2004–05 NBA Rookie of the Year Award.

In the 2005 NBA draft, the Bobcats drafted Raymond Felton and Sean May from North Carolina. With them, in addition to Okafor and Wallace, the team hoped to build a solid foundation for future success. In their second season, the Bobcats opened the new Charlotte Bobcats Arena with an overtime victory over the Boston Celtics. After the season, the Bobcats announced that NBA legend and North Carolina native Michael Jordan had bought a minority stake in the team, becoming the second-largest shareholder. As part of the deal, he became head of basketball operations. Though Bickerstaff remained general manager, Jordan had the final say on all basketball matters.

Following the slump, Michael Jordan announced that head coach Bernie Bickerstaff would not return the following season, but would finish coaching the current season. The Bobcats won 11 of their last 19 games of Bickerstaff's tenure to finish their third season with a  record. In three seasons with the Bobcats, Bickerstaff finished with an overall record of 77–169.

Front office and coaching were key focuses for the Bobcats during the 2007 offseason. Rod Higgins was hired as general manager, and Sam Vincent was hired as the second head coach.  Phil Ford was added to the coaching staff over the summer, and another position was filled when Buzz Peterson was hired from Coastal Carolina University to become director of player personnel.  In the 2007 NBA draft, Brandan Wright was selected by the Bobcats with the eighth pick, then traded to Golden State in a deal that sent Jason Richardson to Charlotte. The Bobcats were unable to capitalize on offseason moves, finishing the 2007–08 season with a disappointing  record. The team, which had felt confident the season would end with its first playoff berth, struggled amid rumors of players clashing with the coach.  Only lasting one year, in which he struggled with personnel decisions, Vincent was fired on April 26, 2008.

2008–2010: Larry Brown era
On April 29, 2008 the Bobcats hired Basketball Hall of Famer Larry Brown as the third head coach in franchise history.  With the ninth selection of the 2008 NBA draft, the Bobcats selected D. J. Augustin from Texas. On December 10, 2008, a little over a month into the season, the Bobcats traded their leading scorer, Jason Richardson along with Jared Dudley to Phoenix in exchange for Boris Diaw and Raja Bell. The trade turned out to be quite successful as the team came very close to reaching the franchise's first playoff berth during the 2008–09 season, but finished four games out of eighth place with a team record of 35 wins and 47 losses. Team members voiced frustration at management for hosting the Charlotte Jumper Classic, an equestrian event, at the end of the season. The scheduling conflict forced the Bobcats to play their final four games on the road, virtually ending their playoff hopes. Following the season, Robert L. Johnson announced he was putting the team up for sale.

2009–2012: Playoffs, new ownership, and struggles
During the offseason, Gerald Henderson from Duke was chosen by the Bobcats with the 12th pick in the 2009 NBA draft. They traded Emeka Okafor for New Orleans Hornets center Tyson Chandler, and acquired Stephen Jackson and Acie Law from the Golden State Warriors. On February 27, 2010, Robert Johnson announced the sale of the team to Michael Jordan, making him the first former NBA player to become majority owner of a franchise.

Gerald Wallace was a huge factor in the run to the playoffs as he became the first Bobcats player selected as an NBA All-Star. However, in the first round of the playoffs, the Bobcats were swept by the Orlando Magic, quickly ending their season.

2011–2019: Kemba Walker era
The Bobcats began the 2010–11 season with high hopes following the previous season's success. Despite the departures of key players Raymond Felton and Tyson Chandler, the Bobcats started their season hoping to once again make the playoffs. However, they struggled early, and on December 22, 2010, following a dismal  start, Michael Jordan announced that Larry Brown had stepped down as head coach. That same day, veteran coach Paul Silas returned to Charlotte for the first time since 2001. On February 24, 2011, at the NBA trade deadline, the Bobcats moved to clear salary cap space by sending former all-star forward Gerald Wallace to the Portland Trail Blazers for two first round draft picks, Joel Przybilla, Sean Marks, and Dante Cunningham. They also sent veteran center Nazr Mohammed to the Oklahoma City Thunder for D. J. White and Morris Peterson. Going down the stretch, the injuries to Stephen Jackson and Tyrus Thomas derailed any chances of Charlotte trying to catch the Indiana Pacers, who swept them 4–0 in the regular season to secure the eighth spot in the east. In the end, the Bobcats finished the season with a  record, finishing  under Paul Silas.

On June 13, 2011, the Bobcats hired former Portland Trail Blazers general manager Rich Cho for their own GM and promoted Rod Higgins to President of Basketball Operations. On the day of the 2011 NBA draft the Bobcats sent Stephen Jackson, Shaun Livingston, and the 19th overall pick to the Milwaukee Bucks. In return, the Bobcats received former Duke star Corey Maggette and the 7th overall pick. They used that pick to draft forward Bismack Biyombo and then drafted Kemba Walker, the NCAA basketball tournament Most Outstanding Player, with the 9th pick in the draft. They also traded their 2013 second-round draft pick to the Thunder for 7-footer Byron Mullens and signed sharpshooter Reggie Williams in free agency. The Bobcats started the 2011–12 season with a close 96–95 win against Stephen Jackson and the Milwaukee Bucks in their home opener but wins would be scarce after that. In the lockout-shortened season the Bobcats struggled and posted an NBA-worst record of 7–59, losing the last 23 games of the season. In a nationally televised game against the New York Knicks the Bobcats recorded yet another loss as their win rate dropped to 0.106, setting the record for the worst season by an NBA team (because the season was shortened by the lockout, the 1972–73 Philadelphia 76ers kept the record for most losses in a season, with 73). On April 30, 2012, the Bobcats announced that Silas would not return to the team for the 2012–13 season. St. John's assistant Mike Dunlap was named his successor.

Despite having the best chance of winning the draft lottery, the Bobcats did not get the first pick. In the 2012 NBA draft, the Bobcats selected Michael Kidd-Gilchrist with the second overall pick. They also selected Jeffery Taylor with the thirty-first pick. They added Ben Gordon, Ramon Sessions and Brendan Haywood. The Bobcats' first game was against the Indiana Pacers, and they won 90–89 with a heated last minute battle, snapping their 23-game losing streak. On November 13, 2012, the Bobcats traded guard Matt Carroll to the New Orleans Hornets for power forward Hakim Warrick. The team seemed to rebound with a 7–5 start to the season in which 6 of the 7 wins were by 4 points or less. However, they promptly went on an 18-game losing streak from which they never recovered, snapping the streak in a victory at Chicago on New Year's Eve. They finished , the second-worst record in the league. On April 23, 2013, Dunlap was fired, reportedly because the players were turned off by his heavy-handed coaching style. Dunlap would be replaced by former Los Angeles Lakers assistant head coach Steve Clifford.

2012–2014: Final years as the Bobcats
On May 21, 2013, Jordan announced the franchise had applied to change its name to the Charlotte Hornets for the 2014–15 NBA season, pending a majority vote by the NBA Board of Governors at a meeting in Las Vegas on July 18, 2013. Deputy Commissioner and COO Adam Silver had previously said it could take 18 months, but the fact that the league owned the rights to the Hornets name could speed up the process. The New Orleans Hornets had recently changed their name to the New Orleans Pelicans for the 2013–14 NBA season. On July 18, 2013, the NBA unanimously approved the Charlotte Bobcats to reclaim the Hornets name at the conclusion of the 2013–14 season.

During the 2013 NBA draft, the Bobcats selected power forward/center Cody Zeller with the 4th overall pick. The Bobcats would also get former Utah Jazz player Al Jefferson during the free agency period.

On November 22, in a widely expected move, the Bobcats announced they would adopt a modified version of the original Hornets' teal-purple-white palette, with black, gray and light blue as accents. The team unveiled its future logo during halftime of their December 21 game against the Utah Jazz, in a ceremony featuring former Hornets players Dell Curry (now the Bobcats' television color commentator), Muggsy Bogues, Rex Chapman and Kelly Tripucka.  The team then started a campaign to hype the Hornets' return, entitled "Buzz City." On January 16, 2014, the Bobcats revealed new Charlotte Hornets logo shirts, hats and gear.

On February 20, 2014, the Bucks traded Gary Neal and Luke Ridnour to the Bobcats for Ramon Sessions and Jeff Adrien. The Bobcats clinched a playoff berth for the second time in franchise history on April 5, 2014, when they won a road game against the Cleveland Cavaliers. On April 10, 2014, the Bobcats signed forward DJ White for the rest of the season. The Bobcats were swept by defending champions Miami Heat in the first round of the 2014 NBA Playoffs. The fourth game was also the last one as the Charlotte Bobcats.

2014–present: Return of the Hornets

2014–15 season: Return of the Hornets and the birth of Buzz City
On May 20, 2014, the Bobcats became the second incarnation of the Charlotte Hornets. At a press conference, team officials also announced that the renamed Hornets reclaimed the history and records of the 1988–2002 Hornets, while all of the Hornets' records during their time in New Orleans from 2002 to 2013 remained with the Pelicans. Charlotte had already been using footage of the original Hornets as part of the "Buzz City" campaign.

To summarize: after the 2002 season, the original Hornets moved to New Orleans. In 2004, Charlotte was granted a new franchise, the Bobcats. After the 2013–14 season, the Bobcats changed their name back to the Hornets and reclaimed the history and records of the 1988–2002 Hornets. As a result, the Hornets are now deemed as having suspended operations from 2002 to 2004, while the Pelicans are deemed as having joined the league in 2002 as an expansion team.

In the 2014 NBA draft, the Hornets had the No. 9 pick from a trade with the Detroit Pistons, which they used to select Noah Vonleh from Indiana. In the same draft they acquired UConn Husky Shabazz Napier (24th overall pick), Dwight Powell from Stanford, and Semaj Christon from Xavier in the second round. Napier would later be traded to the Miami Heat for P. J. Hairston from the Texas Legends of the NBA Development League (formerly from UNC), the rights to the 55th pick (Semaj Christon), and their 2019 second-round pick and cash considerations. Powell and Brendan Haywood were traded to the Cleveland Cavaliers for Scotty Hopson and cash considerations. Christon was traded to the Oklahoma City Thunder for cash considerations. The Hornets then traded Hopson to the New Orleans Pelicans in exchange for cash considerations.

During the 2014 first year of free agency as the renamed Hornets, the Hornets signed former Indiana Pacers shooting guard Lance Stephenson for three years at $27 million with a team option in the third year. The Hornets also signed former Utah Jazz and Atlanta Hawks forward Marvin Williams to a two-year, $14 million contract. They later added former New Orleans Pelicans guard Brian Roberts, who became the first player in the modern-day Hornets era to play for both the New Orleans Hornets and the Charlotte Hornets. Charlotte finished the 2014-15 season with a  record.

2015–2017: Return to the playoffs and struggles
After the stressful first season as the "reborn" Hornets, the Hornets signed and traded for promising young NBA players such as Nicolas Batum, former Knicks star Jeremy Lin, Jeremy Lamb, Tyler Hansbrough, Spencer Hawes and undrafted rookie Aaron Harrison. In the 2015 NBA draft, the Hornets selected Wisconsin star Frank Kaminsky with the 9th pick. 
This marked first time they were multiple games above .500 since the 2013 season. After Feb. 1, the Hornets went 25–9 in the regular season, which became the third-best winning percentage (.736) in that time span, with only the Warriors and Spurs having better marks. On April 2, the Hornets clinched a playoff spot. The Hornets finished , 3rd overall in the division, with their most regular season victories since the 1999–00 season. Charlotte earned the No. 6 seed in the Eastern Conference playoffs, where they played No. 3 seed Miami in the first round. The Heat cruised by Charlotte in the first two games, however the Hornets won game 3 96–80, marking the franchise's first playoff victory since 2002. Charlotte won the next two games, including a close game 5 in Miami, but lost a crucial game 6 at home. Miami promptly beat the Hornets in game 7, ending their 2015–16 season. 

The following year's off-season, Jeremy Lin would go to sign with the Brooklyn Nets, Al Jefferson to the Indiana Pacers, and Courtney Lee to the New York Knicks. The Hornets were able to re-sign Nicolas Batum and Marvin Williams, as well as bring in former All-star Roy Hibbert, Marco Belinelli and Ramon Sessions for a second stint. Hibbert would be traded mid-season to the Milwaukee Bucks with Spencer Hawes for center Miles Plumlee. Kemba Walker was named an Eastern Conference All-star as a reserve, the first all-star game of his career. The Hornets would finish the season with a  record, missing the playoffs.

2017–2019: The final years of Kemba Walker era
The Hornets had a successful off-season by sending Miles Plumlee, Marco Belinelli, and their 41st pick to Atlanta in exchange for Dwight Howard and Atlanta's 31st pick. In the 2017 NBA draft, the Hornets drafted Malik Monk of Kentucky with their 11th pick. Former Duke guard, Frank Jackson was originally drafted with their 31st pick before being traded to the New Orleans Pelicans in exchange for Dwayne Bacon (40th overall pick) and cash considerations. On July 7, the team signed the 2014 Rookie of the year, Michael Carter-Williams. 

The Hornets started the season with a 90-102 defeat at the hands of Detroit Pistons. The Hornets would went on to a 3-game winning streak by victories over Orlando Magic, Memphis Grizzlies, and the Milwaukee Bucks. However, the Hornets would went on to lose the next six matches, they managed to stop the losing streak with victory over Los Angeles Clippers. On 4 February, Walker broke the franchise record for 3-pointers made with 930, surpassing the previous record holder, Dell Curry. On 7 February, Hornets traded Johnny O'Bryant III and two future second round picks to the New York Knicks in exchange for Willy Hernangómez. On February 8, Walker made his second consecutive All-star appearance by replacing the injured Kristaps Porzingis. The team parted ways with GM Rich Cho on February 20, he was replaced by Interim General Manager, Buzz Peterson. On March 28, Walker surpassed Dell Curry (9,839 points) as the franchise's career scoring leader despite the loss against Cleveland Cavaliers. On April 8, the team announced that they have reached a deal with Mitch Kupchak to become their new General Manager. The Hornets finished their season with  record, missing the playoffs for the second consecutive year. On April 18, the team announced that they have relieved Steve Clifford from his coaching duties. On May 9, the team has reached an agreement with San Antonio Spurs assistant coach, James Borrego as their new head coach.

The following season marks the 30th year of The Hornets in the NBA. On June 19, the team announced that Muggsy Bogues would join Dell Curry as the team's ambassador. Charlotte was selected as the host for the 2019 NBA All-Star Game.

On the eve of the 2018 NBA Draft, the Hornets traded Dwight Howard in exchange for Timofey Mozgov, two second round picks (the 45th pick in 2018, and 2021 second round pick). The deal was made official after the moratorium ends on 6 July. Through the draft, the team acquired forward Miles Bridges (12th overall pick), Devonte Graham (34th overall pick), and the draft rights to Lithuanian forward, Arnoldas Kulboka (55th overall pick). On July 23, the Hornets acquired Tony Parker from the free agency.

Kemba Walker was announced as the starter for the 2019 NBA All-Star Game, becoming the third Hornets player to start the All-Star Game, along with Larry Johnson (1993), and Eddie Jones (2000). On the final game of the season, the Hornets needed to defeat Orlando Magic and for the New York Knicks to defeat the Detroit Pistons (The latter were also aiming for the eighth seed). Unfortunately, the Hornets were defeated by the Magic, while the Pistons managed to edge the Knicks to claim the eighth seed, meaning that the Hornets missed the 2019 NBA playoffs, marking the third consecutive time the team missed the playoffs. This was also the first time Tony Parker missed the playoffs in his career.

On June 11, Parker announced his retirement from the NBA after 18 seasons.

2019–present: Post-Walker era

2019–20 season: Walker's departure and suspension of the season
The Hornets acquired forwards P. J. Washington (12th pick), Cody Martin (36th pick), and Jalen McDaniels (52th pick) from the 2019 NBA draft. On July 6, Walker was traded along a future second round pick to the Boston Celtics in exchange for Terry Rozier and a future second round pick through a sign-and-trade agreement, marking the end of Walker's tenure.

The new season started with a win over Chicago Bulls on October 23, with new draftee Washington scoring 27 points in his NBA debut. The team suffered an eight game losing streak from January 6 until January 24, which includes the NBA game at Paris against Milwaukee Bucks.

On March 11, the NBA announced the suspension of the season in response to the COVID-19 outbreak. The Hornets were  when the season was officially suspended. The Hornets were among eight teams that were not invited to play in the 2020 NBA Bubble, after owner Michael Jordan reportedly stating that player safety should be the priority and that there were no reason for the lottery teams to continue playing. The Hornets (along with the other uninvited teams) however, are allowed to hold voluntary workouts with campus settings.

2020–present: LaMelo Ball era

With the 3rd pick of the 2020 NBA Draft, the Hornets select guard LaMelo Ball. Ball previously played with two high schools in the United States: Chino Hills, and Spire Academy, before stints with Lithuanian League team, BC Prienai and Australian League team, Illawarra Hawks before declaring for the NBA draft. In the same draft, the Hornets also selected Duke center Vernon Carey Jr. (32nd pick) and College of Charleston guard Grant Riller (56th pick), whilst acquiring Nick Richards from the Pelicans. On November 29, the Hornets waived Nicolas Batum's $27.1 million contract for 2020-21 season. On the same day, the team officially acquired forward Gordon Hayward, 2023 and 2024 second-round draft picks from Boston Celtics, through a sign-and-trade deal, while the Hornets sent Celtics their conditional 2022 second-round draft pick. The following day, the team officially signed Ball. 

The Hornets were defeated by the Cavaliers in the first match with new draftee Ball going scoreless on his debut. Three days later, the Hornets were defeated at home by the Thunder with the scoreline of 109-107 after Shai Gilgeous-Alexander scored the tie-breaking jumper with only 1.4 seconds left.

References

Charlotte Hornets
Charlotte Hornets